The Pavlyuk uprising of 1637 was a Cossack uprising in Left-bank Ukraine and Zaporizhia headed by Pavlo Mikhnovych against the abuses of the nobility and magnates of Polish–Lithuanian Commonwealth. The uprising was sparked by several Cossacks expelled from the Cossack Registry. Mikhnovych ordered the captured commanders of the Registered Cossacks to be executed and issued a declaration, in which he proclaimed a fight against the masters. Defeated by the forces of Mikołaj Potocki in the Battle of Kumeyki in 1637, he was brought to Warsaw, tried and executed. The uprising was bloodily quelled, only to restart the following year in the form of the Ostrzanin Uprising, also defeated by the Commonwealth.

History 
It is unclear what sparked the rebellion. Most likely it was the social tension between the "Blacks", or poor peasants of the Right-Bank Ukraine, and mighty magnates like Jeremi Wiśniowiecki, who owned considerable wealth and lands in Ruthenia. Around that time local magnates tried to impose the system of pańszczyzna onto local plebeians, which rose tensions to record levels. Another reason for dissent was the number of Registered Cossacks on royal payroll, considered too small by many poor inhabitants of the region.

One of the leaders of the "Blacks", or poor peasants and non-registered Cossacks, Pavel Mikhnovych But nicknamed Pavlyuk, gathered around himself a large band of armed Zaporozhian Cossacks and reached the fortress town of Korsuń, the headquarters of the Registered Cossacks and the largest Polish royal outpost in the Borderlands. Pavlyuk had already taken part in the earlier Sulima Uprising of 1635, but was pardoned when he promised not to rise arms against the Commonwealth again.

He defeated the leader of the Registered Cossacks, Vasil Tumulenko, captured a large artillery park and proclaimed himself the new hetman of all Cossacks. He also issued a proclamation to "all Christians" urging them to join his ranks, exploiting all possible sources of dissent in the area, from religious differences, to the defence of "golden liberties", supposedly being violated by the szlachta. The new Cossack uprising was to be quelled by hetman Stanisław Koniecpolski, however his declining health made the king offer the bulawa to hetman Mikołaj Potocki instead.

On 3 July 1637 Pavlyuk arrived at Kaniów, where he tried to convince the remaining leaders of the Registered Cossacks to betray their loyalty to the king of Poland and fight with him for an autonomous Cossack state between Kiev and Bila Tserkva. However, the Cossack leaders remained sceptical and most remained loyal to the Commonwealth. Unable to convince the well-trained and well-equipped Registered Cossacks to join him, Pavlyuk also dispatched emissaries to Alexis I, tsar of Muscovy and to İnayet Giray, the khan of Crimea. His efforts at securing outside help proved equally unsuccessful.

Eventually the forces of the Crown of Poland under Mikołaj Potocki entered Ukraine and joined with the Registered Cossacks. On 16 December 1637 the combined force attacked the Cossacks at Kumeyki near Cherkassy, in what became known as the battle of Kumeyki. Inexperienced Cossacks overextended their wagon fort and their lines were easily pierced by experienced soldiers such as Samuel Łaszcz. The battle, while disastrous for the Registered Cossacks who were killed almost to the last man, was victorious for the Polish side and the Cossacks retreated in disarray, while Pavlyuk was captured.

The remaining bands of armed Cossacks were soon defeated and "pushed back into the holes they crawled from", as one contemporary author put it. The remnants of the Cossack forces capitulated on 24 December 1637 in the town of Borowica, between the Dnieper and Taśmina Rivers. The Polish commander in chief gave his word to the defeated Cossacks that both ordinary soldiers and their leader would be spared. In return, the Cossacks surrendered their arms and their remaining leaders. The person to sign the agreement in the name of the Cossacks was Bohdan Khmelnytsky who 11 years later led the largest Cossack uprising against the Commonwealth.

Aftermath 
The agreement at Borowica was soon broken by both sides. Pavlyuk was soon afterwards brought to Warsaw, tried by the king and executed for high treason. The Cossacks on their part rebelled again the following spring. The uprising was bloodily quelled, and the Rebellion of Ostrzanin and Hunia the following summer was drowned in blood as well.

See also
 Trakhtemyriv

References

Citations

Bibliography 

 
 
 

1637 in Europe
Conflicts in 1637
17th century in the Zaporozhian Host
Cossack uprisings
Rebellions in Ukraine
17th-century rebellions
1630s in the Polish–Lithuanian Commonwealth